Kırkharman can refer to:

 Kırkharman, Çilimli
 Kırkharman, Taşova